The 2002 Detroit Tigers season was the team's 102nd season and its 3rd at Comerica Park.  It involved the Detroit Tigers making a valiant attempt to win the AL Central.  However, despite their best efforts and clutch performances, their division-winning goal came up far short. They finished last in the division and missed the playoffs for the 15th consecutive season.

Offseason
December 19, 2001: Adam Riggs was signed as a free agent with the Detroit Tigers.

Regular season
On July 2, the Tigers and White Sox set a Major League Baseball record by combining to hit for 12 home runs in one game. The box score for the home runs is as follows:

 Detroit Young 2 (7,1st inning off Ritchie 0 on, 2 out, 9th inning off Howry 0 on, 2 out); Fick (11,1st inning off Ritchie 1 on, 2 out); Lombard (1,7th inning off Ritchie 0 on, 1 out); Magee (6,9th inning off Howry 0 on, 0 out); Easley (4,9th inning off Howry 1 on).
 Chicago Lofton (4,1st inning off Bernero 0 on, 0 out); Ordonez 2 (15,1st inning off Bernero 0 on, 2 out, 8th inning off Paniagua 3 on, 1 out); Valentin (11,2nd inning off Bernero 0 on, 0 out); Alomar 2 (6,4th inning off Bernero 0 on, 2 out, 6th inning off Lima 0 on).

Notable transactions
 June 4, 2002: Curtis Granderson was drafted by the Tigers in the 3rd round of the 2002 Major League Baseball draft. Player signed June 28, 2002.
 July 5, 2002: Jeff Weaver was traded by the Tigers to the New York Yankees, and cash was sent by the Tigers to the Oakland Athletics, as part of a 3-team trade. The Athletics sent Carlos Peña, Franklyn Germán, and a player to be named later to the Tigers. The Yankees sent Ted Lilly, John-Ford Griffin, and Jason Arnold (minors) to the Athletics. The Athletics completed the trade by sending Jeremy Bonderman to the Tigers on August 22.
 August 16, 2002: Jason Beverlin was selected off waivers by the Tigers from the Cleveland Indians.

Season standings

American League Wild Card

Record vs. opponents

Roster

Player stats

Batting

Starters by position
Note: Pos = Position; G = Games played; AB = At bats; H = Hits; Avg. = Batting average; HR = Home runs; RBI = Runs batted in

Other batters
Note: G = Games played; AB = At bats; H = Hits; Avg. = Batting average; HR = Home runs; RBI = Runs batted in

Pitching

Starting and other pitchers
Note: G = Games pitched; IP = Innings pitched; W = Wins; L = Losses; ERA = Earned run average; SO = Strikeouts

Relief pitchers
Note: G = Games pitched; W = Wins; L = Losses; SV = Saves; ERA = Earned run average; SO = Strikeouts

Awards and Records
 On July 2, the White Sox and Tigers set a Major League record by hitting 12 home runs in one game.

Farm system

References

External links

2002 Detroit Tigers season at Baseball Reference

Detroit Tigers seasons
Detroit Tigers
Detroit
2002 in Detroit